Wola Idzikowska  is a village in the administrative district of Gmina Fajsławice, within Krasnystaw County, Lublin Voivodeship, in eastern Poland.

References

Wola Idzikowska